Sound Awake is the second studio album by Australian progressive/alternative rock band Karnivool, released in Australia on 5 June 2009. At the J Awards of 2009, the album was nominated for Australian Album of the Year.

At the 2010 West Australian Music Industry Awards, the album won Most Popular Album.

Album background
The album follows a four-year gap since their debut studio album Themata in 2005.
Sound Awake was produced by Forrester Savell (The Butterfly Effect, Dallas Frasca) and recorded at Perth's Blackbird and Kingdom Studios over several months. It was later mixed at Melbourne's Sing Sing Studios and mastered by Tom Coyne (DJ Shadow, The Roots) at Sterling Sounds in New York City.

In an interview bassist Jon Stockman describes the differences between the band's two albums.

The name of the album was conceived by Drew Goddard and the album cover artwork was undertaken by graphic designers, Joe Kapiteyn and Chris Frey. 

The album was released on 5 June 2009 through Cymatic Records and distributed by Sony Music Australia. The first single from the album, "Set Fire to the Hive", was released prior to it, on 28 April 2009, with a video being released on 8 May.  The second single, "All I Know", was released on 9 November 2009, along with an accompanying music video.

Sound Awake was played as the 'feature album' on radio station Triple J. They played the entire album, one song per day, with some songs featuring short spoken introductions by members of the band.  On 17 July 2009 it was nominated for a J Award – 'Australian Album of the Year'.

Reception

Sound Awake received a largely positive reaction from music critics. Adam Greenberg of Allmusic wrote that Sound Awake expanded Karnivool's musical scope beyond the alternative metal sound of Themata. He cited similarities in the musicality of the album to the work of contemporaries such as Audioslave, Stone Temple Pilots and Velvet Revolver, but felt that often the band's exploration of progressive metal sounded too similar to the work of Tool. Darren Sadler of Rock Sound summarised Sound Awake as "an album of immense progressive proportions that boasts some brilliant atmospherics, excellent melodies courtesy of vocalist Ian Kenny, accomplished musicianship and adventurous songwriting", singling "Deadman" and "Change" out as the album's highlights. Jacob Royal of Sputnikmusic complimented Karnivool's experimentation and musicianship, writing that many of the tracks build in dynamics well and feature complex percussive arrangements from drummer Steve Judd. He considered "Illumine" and "Simple Boy" among the weakest points of the album, but praised most of the other featured songs. drr00t of Melodic considered the album a "masterpiece", directing praise at the performances of Judd and bassist Jon Stockman, and writing that "the instrumentation on this album is nothing short of complex, but the band still stays true to its melodies and fit the two together seamlessly". Jonathan Barkan of Bloody Disgusting compared Sound Awake to the work of Tool, Porcupine Tree, Muse and The Mars Volta, "while still being able to sound original and unique".

The album debuted at number two on the ARIA Album Charts on 15 June 2009, behind The Black Eyed Peas' The E.N.D.. It was also the top independent release in Australia, debuting at number one on the AIR Charts. The album received Gold certification for sales in Australia, and in 2012 was voted the #1 album of the years 2000–2009 by Heavy Blog Is Heavy.

Track listing

Notes
"Deadman" does not run until 12:04, it stops at 10:08, and after 4 seconds of silence, at minute 10:12 begins a hidden track: it is a re-recorded version of the closing song from Themata, "Change (Part 1)", which then segues into "Change (Part 2)". The re-recorded version of "Change (Part 1)" contains vibraphone instead of the ambience found on the Themata version, and only runs for 1:57, compared to the Themata version, which run to 3:28. It also contains slightly modified lyrics from the original.

Personnel
Credits are adapted from the album's liner notes.

Band
 Drew Goddard – guitar, backing vocals
 Ian Kenny – vocals, acoustic guitar on "Change"
 Jon Stockman – bass
 Mark Hosking – guitar, backing vocals
 Steve Judd – drums, percussion

Additional musicians
 Grant McCulloch – additional vocals on"Deadman"
 Jason Bunn – viola on "Umbra"
 Javin Sun – additional vocals on "Goliath"
 Jessop Maticevski-Shumack – additional vocals on "Goliath"
 Jules Pacy-Cole – additional vocals on "Goliath"
 Louise Conray – additional percussion on "Simple Boy" and "Change"
 Prue Glenn – conductor
 Sam Pilot Kickett – didgeridoo on "Change"
 Talfryn Dawlings – additional vocals on "Goliath"
 Zak Hanyn – additional vocals on "Goliath"

Production
 Chris Frey – concept and design
 Dave Parkin – mixing on "The Medicine Wears Off" and "The Caudal Lure"
 Forrester Savell – producer and mixing
 Karnivool – producer
 Nicole Norelli – photography
 Rick Mafferty – mix assistant
 Tom Coyne – mastering

Charts

Weekly charts

Year-end charts

Certifications

References

2009 albums
Karnivool albums